NGC 1872 is an open cluster within the Large Magellanic Cloud in the constellation Dorado. It was discovered by James Dunlop in 1826.

NGC 1872 has characteristics of both globular clusters and open clusters - it is visually as rich as a typical globular but is much younger, and, like many open clusters, has bluer stars. Such intermediate clusters are common in the Large Magellanic Cloud.

Gallery

References

External links

 

Open clusters
Dorado (constellation)
1872
Large Magellanic Cloud